Wander Samuel Franco Aybar Sr. (born March 1, 2001), nicknamed "El Patron", is a Dominican professional baseball shortstop for the Tampa Bay Rays of Major League Baseball (MLB). He made his MLB debut in 2021.

Professional career

Minor leagues 
Franco was ranked as one of the top international prospects in the 2017 international class. He signed with the Tampa Bay Rays organization on July 2, 2017. Franco made his professional debut in 2018 with the Princeton Rays. On July 14, 2018, Franco hit for the cycle while playing for Princeton. In 2018, at only 17 years old, Franco was named the 2018 Appalachian League Player of the Year after hitting .374/.445/.636 with 11 home runs and 57 runs batted in (RBIs) over 245 plate appearances for the Princeton Rays. 

Prior to the 2019 season, Franco was ranked as the fourth best prospect in baseball by Baseball America. He began the season with the Bowling Green Hot Rods. He was promoted to the Charlotte Stone Crabs on June 25. Franco was named to the 2019 All-Star Futures Game. He finished the 2019 season with a .327/.398/.487 slash line with nine home runs and 53 RBIs.

Prior to the 2020 season, Franco was ranked the  1 prospect in all of baseball. On September 22, the Rays added Franco to their Player pool of players who would be eligible to play in the Major League Baseball postseason. Franco did not appear in an MLB game, and did not play in any minor league contests due to the cancellation of the minor league season because of the COVID-19 pandemic.

The Rays invited Franco to major league spring training in 2021, but he did not make the team, and began the season in Triple-A with the Durham Bulls. In 39 games with Durham, Franco logged a .315/.367/.586 slash line with seven home runs and 35 RBIs.

Tampa Bay Rays

2021 season
On June 20, 2021, the Rays announced that Franco would be promoted to the major leagues, prior to the team’s series against the Boston Red Sox. He was formally selected to the 40-man roster on June 22. Franco made his MLB debut the same day. In the game, Franco recorded his first career hit, home run, and RBI on a three-run shot off of Red Sox starter Eduardo Rodríguez in the fifth inning.

On August 25, Franco reached base safely for the 26th consecutive game, setting a record for the longest run by a player under 21 years old since 1961. On September 7, Franco reached base safely for the 37th consecutive time passing Mickey Mantle’s 36 game on base streak for a player 20-years old or younger.

On November 23, 2021, Franco and the Rays agreed to an eleven-year, $182 million contract extension, with a club option of $25 million for a twelfth year. At age 20, Franco became the youngest player in baseball history to sign a contract worth at least $100 million, passing Ronald Acuña Jr.'s eight-year, $100 million contract extension signed in 2019. Franco's deal was the largest for any player with less than one year of major league service.

2022 season
On April 22, 2022, Franco had his first multi home run game against the Boston Red Sox. Franco became the youngest player in Tampa Bay Rays franchise history to have a multi homer game, doing so at age 21 and 52 days old.

On May 31, 2022, Franco was placed on the 10-Day IL due to a strained quadriceps. He was activated on June 26. On July 9, 2022, Franco was placed on the 10-Day injured list, two days later it was announced Franco would miss 5-8 weeks due to hand surgery. On September 9, 2022 he was activated off the injured list.

International career 
Franco represented the Dominican Republic in the 2023 World Baseball Classic. With Willy Adames and Jeremy Peña at shortstop, he instead played second base, splitting time with Ketel Marte. Over the course of nine at-bats in three games, Franco slashed .222/.417/.222, leading the team in walks (along with Juan Soto) with three.

Personal life
His brothers, Wander Alexander Franco and Wander Javier Franco, played in the Houston Astros and San Francisco Giants organizations. His father, also named Wander, played minor league ball in the 1990s. His mother, Nancy Aybar, is the sister of Erick Aybar and Willy Aybar, both of whom played in Major League Baseball.

Franco married his girlfriend after the 2021 MLB season. The pair have a son, Wander Samuel Franco Jr., born in late 2018, and have another son due in summer 2022.

References

External links

2001 births
Living people
People from Baní
Dominican Republic expatriate baseball players in the United States
Major League Baseball players from the Dominican Republic
Major League Baseball shortstops
Major League Baseball third basemen
Tampa Bay Rays players
Princeton Rays players
Bowling Green Hot Rods players
Charlotte Stone Crabs players
Gigantes del Cibao players
Leones del Escogido players
Durham Bulls players
2023 World Baseball Classic players